This is a list of notable magazines devoted to horticulture and gardening.

Canada
 Garden Culture 
 Greenhouse Canada 
 Garden Making

United Kingdom
 Amateur Gardening - monthly, published by IPC
 BBC Gardeners' World
 Curtis's Botanical Magazine (1787) - now published by Kew Gardens
 The Garden - from 1866 as The Journal of the Royal Horticultural Society, under this title since 1975
 Garden Culture - quarterly, published by GC Publishers
 The Gardeners' Chronicle (1841) - now part of Horticulture Week
 Horticulture Week
 The Plantsman (1979) - quarterly, published by the Royal Horticultural Society
 The Orchid Review (1893) - quarterly, published by the Royal Horticultural Society

United States 

 Arnoldia - quarterly, published by the Arnold Arboretum of Harvard University
 Fine Gardening - bimonthly, published by Taunton Press
 Horticulture Magazine - originally a journal of the Massachusetts Horticultural Society now privately published
 MaryJanesFarm - bimonthly, published by MaryJane Butters and Belvoir Media Group
 Sukiya Living Magazine - bimonthly, published by Journal of Japanese Gardening (JOJG)

See also

Lists of magazines

Gardening lists